Tuesday Night Baseball is the de facto branding used for nationally televised live game telecasts of Major League Baseball games on Tuesday evenings during the regular season. Up until the 2021 season, Tuesday night games aired on FS1, ESPN and MLB Network. Beginning with the 2022 season, games will air on TBS, branded as MLB on TBS Tuesday Night. 

Because TBS airs only one game on Tuesday nights, MLB Network will often air a second doubleheader game before, or after, the TBS game airs.

History

Prior to 1980
Prior to 1984, only the Major League Baseball All Star Game aired on consistently on Tuesday nights. The only nationally regular season game aired on a Tuesday was by ABC in 1954.

NBC (1980, 1982–1983, 1987–1989)
Under the initial agreement with ABC, NBC, and Major League Baseball (1976–1979), the two networks paid a combined $92.8 million. ABC paid $12.5 million per year to show 16 Monday night games in 1976, 18 in the next three years, plus half the postseason (the League Championship Series in even numbered years and World Series in odd numbered years). NBC paid $10.7 million per year to show 25 Saturday Games of the Week and the other half of the postseason (the League Championship Series in odd numbered years and World Series in even numbered years).

On April 7, 1983, Major League Baseball agreed to terms with ABC and NBC on a six-year television package, worth $1.2 billion. The two networks would continue to alternate coverage of the playoffs (ABC in even-numbered years and NBC in odd-numbered years), World Series (ABC would televise the World Series in odd-numbered years and NBC in even-numbered years) and All-Star Game (ABC would televise the All-Star Game in even-numbered years and NBC in odd-numbered years) through the 1989 season, with each of the 26 clubs receiving $7 million per year in return (even if no fans showed up). This was a substantial increase over the last package, in which each club was being paid $1.9 million per year. ABC contributed $575 million for the rights to televise prime time and Sunday afternoon regular season games and NBC paid $550 million for the rights to broadcast 30 Saturday afternoon games.

NBC also would normally televise two prime time games during the regular season (not including All-Star Games). Generally, NBC would broadcast at least one game (per season) on a Tuesday.

ESPN (consistently: 1990–1993, select games: 1995, 1997–2021)
On January 5, 1989, Major League Baseball signed a $400 million deal with ESPN, who would show over 175 games beginning in 1990. For the next four years, ESPN would televise six games a week (Sunday Night Baseball, Wednesday Night Baseball and doubleheaders on Tuesdays and Fridays), as well as multiple games on Opening Day, Memorial Day, Independence Day, and Labor Day.

Since the end of that contract ESPN has not officially aired a full slate of Tuesday night games but has consistently aired several games per year since 1997. With Turner Sports gaining the exclusive rights to MLB games on Tuesday nights, Tuesday night ESPN games were discontinued.

Fox Sports

FX (1997–1998)
In 1997, FX obtained the partial pay-TV rights to MLB games; while most game telecasts aired on Monday nights or Saturday nights, 11 games in 1997 and 1 game in 1998 aired on Tuesdays.

Fox Broadcasting Company (All–Star Game: 1997, 1999, 2001–2019, 2021–present) (regular season: 1998)

While usually airing MLB on Saturday nights Fox aired one Tuesday Night Baseball game in 1998, a game where Mark McGwire hit his record-breaking 62nd home run of the season, which earned a 14.5 rating share for Fox, and remains the network's highest-rated regular season Major League Baseball telecast to this day. In 1997, 1999, and every year since 2001 (with the exception of 2020, when the MLB All Star Game was cancelled due to the Covid-19 pandemic) Fox has aired the Major League Baseball All-Star Game on the second Tuesday of July.

FS1 (2014–present) 

While not weekly, FS1 has aired baseball on Tuesday nights occasionally since 2014. The games include:

MLB Network Showcase (2009–present)

On April 9, 2009, MLB Network aired its first ever self-produced live baseball telecast. The network typically produces 26 non-exclusive live games a year during the regular season; since one or both teams' local TV rights holders also carry the games, the MLB Network feed is subject to local blackouts. In that event, the cities in the blacked-out markets will instead see a simulcast of another scheduled game via one team's local TV rights holder.

MLB on TBS Tuesdays (2022–present)

Prior to 2022, during the regular season, TBS broadcast a weekly game nationally on Sunday afternoons, under the title Sunday MLB on TBS. These games were not exclusive to TBS and were blacked out in local markets, to protect the stations that hold the local broadcast rights to the games. In the affected areas, simulcasts of programming from sister network HLN aired in place of the games.

On September 24, 2020, it was announced that Turner Sports had renewed its baseball rights through 2028 (aligned with the conclusion of Fox's most recent extension). However instead of a package of Sunday afternoon games the contract includes primetime games on Tuesday nights throughout the regular season.

The program includes a 30-minute studio show before and after each game.

References

External links
 Searchable Network TV Broadcasts

MLB Network original programming
Major League Baseball on television
Turner Sports
Major League Baseball on Fox
ESPN original programming
TBS (American TV channel) original programming
American sports television series
Fox Sports 1 original programming
FX Networks original programming
1990s American television series
2000s American television series
2010s American television series
2020s American television series
Tuesday